The Hotak or  Hotaki is a tribe of the Ghilji confederacy of the Pashtun people. The Hotak started centuries ago as a political family. The first king to take power in Kandahar, Afghanistan, was Mirwais Hotak (1673–1715). After his death many different Hotaks took the throne, such as Mahmud Hotak, Ashraf Hotak, and Hussain Hotak, eventually losing control.

See also
Hotak dynasty
Mirwais Hotak
Tokhi
Nazo Tokhi
Pashtun tribes

References

Ghilji Pashtun tribes